Garly Sojo (born 23 September 1999) is a Venezuelan basketball player who last played for the Capitanes de Ciudad de México of the NBA G League.

Personal
Sojo grew up in the Caricuao district of Caracas.

Professional career 
Sojo played for Cocodrilos de Caracas of the Liga Profesional de Baloncesto (LPB) in 2019 under the command of coach Nelson “Kako” Solórzano. There, he participated in the LPB Cup with and in addition, he played for the clubs's team in the Liga Especial de Desarrollo (Special Development League) (LED 1). In 13 games for the club's U21 team, he posted numbers of 17.7 points, 9.2 rebounds, 2.5 assists and 1.0 block per game, finishing as 2019 LPB Cup's "Rookie of the year". The coaching staff was led by the Argentine Fernando Duró. 

On February 3, 2020 at Cocodrilos Sports Park, Sojo stated that he would be absent a few weeks to carry out procedures in Colombia due to a latent opportunity in the United States at the end of June.  

On November 11, 2021, Sojo signed with the Capitanes de Ciudad de México of the NBA G League.

On March 1, 2022, Sojo signed with Argentine club Quimsa.

National team 
He played for Venezuela's U21 National Team at the FIBA South America Under-21 Championship in Tunja, Colombia, in August 2019. In five games he averaged 17.6 points, 2.6 steals and 2.4 assists.

Sojo was also part of the his country's 3 × 3 team that participated in the 2019 World Beach Games in Doha, Qatar.
 
He played for the Venezuelan national basketball team at the 2020 FIBA Men's Olympic Qualifying Tournaments – Kaunas.

Player profile 
He can play both the Guard and Forward positions.

In early 2020, Sojo stated that his strengths are defense, steals and rebounds. He further mentioned that he needed to improve his strength as well as his long distance shot.

References

External links
Profile at Latinbasket.com
FIBA Profile at 2020 FIBA Men's Olympic Qualifying Tournaments – Kaunas
FIBA Profile at 2022 FIBA AmeriCup qualification
Profile at Proballers
Profile at RealGM.com
Profile at scoutBasketball

1999 births
Living people
Point guards
Capitanes de Ciudad de México players
Quimsa basketball players
Sportspeople from Caracas
Venezuelan expatriate basketball people in Argentina
Venezuelan expatriate basketball people in Mexico
Venezuelan men's basketball players